The Beatnuts are a hip hop group and production team from Queens, New York. Its two current members, Psycho Les and Juju, have been involved in every Beatnuts album, while Al' Tariq left the Beatnuts after their eponymous 1994 release. The Beatnuts have released six full-length studio albums, two extended plays, one instrumental album, three compilation albums and 21 singles. They have also been featured on other artists' songs as both vocalists and producers. The Beatnuts self-produce all of their songs.

The Beatnuts' debut release was Intoxicated Demons, a 1993 EP released by Relativity Records. It contained two singles setting a minimum for the next two Beatnuts albums, 1994's The Beatnuts: Street Level and 1997's Stone Crazy. 1997 also saw the release of Hydra Beats, Vol. 5, an instrumental album marketed by Hydra Entertainment instead of the Beatnuts' label Relativity. The Beatnuts followed it up with 1998's The Spot, a remix EP containing one previously unreleased track and 1999's hit album A Musical Massacre. Each of these records was released by Relativity Records, but the Beatnuts would soon sign to Relativity's sister label Loud Records. On Loud, the Beatnuts released 2001's Take It or Squeeze It, but they soon left the label to join the indie label Landspeed Records. They then released the 2002 album The Originators to critical success and commercial failure. The Beatnuts next and last album, 2004's Milk Me, was released by Penalty to slightly better commercial reception than The Originators.

Albums

Studio albums

Compilation albums

Instrumental albums

Extended plays

Singles

As lead artist

As featured performer

Music videos

Vocal appearances

Remixes

Solo work
God Connections (1996) – by Al' Tariq
Kool Fresh (1997) – by Al' Tariq
Psycho Therapy (The Soundtrack) (2007) – by Psycho Les
The City Never Sleeps (2007) – by Psycho Les, Al' Tariq & Problemz as Big City

Notes

References

Hip hop discographies
Discographies of American artists
Production discographies